Rut Brandt (10 January 1920 – 28 July 2006) was a Norwegian-born German writer and the wife of the German Chancellor Willy Brandt between 1948 and 1980, including most of his political career as Governing Mayor of Berlin (1957–1966) and German chancellor (1969–1974). Rut Brandt became highly popular in Germany and a noted public figure in her role as First Lady of Berlin and the chancellor's spouse.

Life
Born Rut Hansen in Hamar, Norway, she worked initially in a bakery in Norway and then as a tailor's apprentice. At age 16, she joined a socialist youth group, which conducted political activities against the German occupation during the Second World War. In 1942, she fled to Sweden with one of her sisters.

In Sweden, she married her Norwegian friend, Ole Olstadt Bergaust, who died in 1946. In 1944, Hansen met Willy Brandt, the later German Chancellor, who had fled Germany. After Bergaust's death, Brandt and Hansen married in 1948.

When Willy Brandt became chancellor in 1969, Rut Brandt was at his side as a very successful and popular First Lady. After the divorce was granted in 1980, Rut and Willy Brandt went their separate ways and never saw each other again. When Brandt died in 1992, Brigitte Seebacher-Brandt did not allow Rut to attend the funeral – a decision which was highly criticised by many Germans.

Rut Brandt died on 28 July 2006 in Berlin, aged 86, from undisclosed causes.

Family
Willy and Rut Brandt had three children:
 Peter Brandt (born 1948), historian
 Lars Brandt (born 1951), writer, filmmaker, artist
 Matthias Brandt (born 1961), actor

Books by Rut Brandt
  (1992) 
  (2001)

References

External links

1920 births
2006 deaths
People from Hamar
Norwegian resistance members
Female resistance members of World War II
Norwegian emigrants to Germany
German autobiographers
Women autobiographers
Norwegian writers
Spouses of chancellors of Germany
Burials at the Waldfriedhof Zehlendorf